Tell Taban is an archaeological site in north-eastern Syria in the Al-Hasakah Governorate. It is the site of the ancient city of Ṭābetu.

Archaeology

The site was first excavated from 1997 until 1999 as a salvage operation in response to the effects of the Hassake dam. A number of inscribed objects, mostly building inscriptions, were found. The site was again excavated in 2005 through 2010. More inscriptions and an archive
containing over 100 cuneiform tablets were found, dating to the Old Babylonian and Middle Assyrian Periods.

History

Ṭābetu
The city was mentioned in 18th century BC as a regional center named Ṭābatum in the tablets of the kingdom of Mari, and was destroyed by Samsu-Iluna of Babylon. Afterward the city come under the control of Terqa for a time. A few centuries later it came under the rule of the Assyrians after the fall of the Mittani.

Autonomous kingdom
An autonomous dynasty ruled the city between the 14th and 12th centuries BC under the suzerainty and acknowledging the supremacy of the Middle Assyrian kings; the rulers of Ṭābetu styled themselves "the kings of Ṭābetu and the Land of Mari".

By the time of middle-Assyrian period kingdom of Ṭābetu, the designation "Mari" was likely used to indicate the lands around Ṭābetu and did not refer to the ancient kingdom of Mari located on the Euphrates. Another possibility is that Mari from the Ṭābetu king's title correspond to "Marê"; a city mentioned c. 803 BC in the stele of Nergal-ereš, a Limmu of the neo-Assyrian king Adad-nirari III. Marê was mentioned in association with Raṣappu which was likely located in the southern and eastern slopes of the Sinjar Mountains.

The origin of the dynasty is vague; the first known two rulers bore Hurrian names. However, "the land of Mari" is mentioned in the Hurrian Mitannian archive of Nuzi, and tablets dating to the 15th and 14th centuries BC from Tell Taban itself reveal that the inhabitants were Amorites. The dynasty could have been Amorite in origin but adopted Hurrian royal names to appease the Mitannian empire. The kings of Ṭābetu seems to have acknowledged the authority of Assyria as soon as the Assyrian conquest of Mitanni began; in return, the Assyrians approved the continuation of the local dynasty whose rulers were quickly Assyrianised and adopted Assyrian names replacing the Hurrian names. This is a list of the kings of Ṭābetu who belonged to the same dynasty.

References

Sources

Shibata, Daisuke, Middle Assyryrian Administrative and Legal Texts from the 2005 Excavation at Tell Taban: A Preliminary Report, Al-Rāfidān, vol. 28, pp. 63–74, 2007
Shibata, D., "An Old Babylonian Manuscript of  the Weidner  God- List  from Tell Taban.", Iraq, vol. 71, pp. 43– 52, 2009
Yamada, S., "Old Babylonian School Exer-cises  from Tell Taban.",  Pages 45– 68 in Scribal Educationa  and  Scribal  Traditions.  Vo l .  1  of  Culture  and  Societies  in  the  Middle  Euphra-tes  and  Habur  Areas  in  the  Second  Millennium  BC.  Edited  by  Shigeo  Yamada  and  Daisuke  Shibata.  Studia  Chaburensia  5. Wiesbaden: Harrassowitz Verlag, 2016
Yamada, S., "An  Adoption  Contract  from  Tell  Taban, the Kings of the Land of Hana and the Hana-Style Scribal Tradition.", RA, vol. 105, pp. 61–84, 2011

See also
Cities of the ancient Near East

Former populated places in Syria
Archaeological sites in al-Hasakah Governorate
Bronze Age sites in Syria
Tells (archaeology)
Former kingdoms